Redland is an unincorporated community in Sequoyah County, Oklahoma, United States.

History
It was named for the area's red soil and had its own post office from May 17, 1883 until June 30, 1937.

References

Unincorporated communities in Sequoyah County, Oklahoma
Unincorporated communities in Oklahoma